Megarctosa is a genus of spiders in the family Lycosidae. It was first described in 1948 by Caporiacco. , it contains 7 species.

Species
Megarctosa comprises the following species:
Megarctosa aequioculata (Strand, 1906)
Megarctosa argentata (Denis, 1947)
Megarctosa bamiana Roewer, 1960
Megarctosa caporiaccoi Roewer, 1960
Megarctosa gobiensis (Schenkel, 1936)
Megarctosa melanostoma (Mello-Leitão, 1941)
Megarctosa naccai Caporiacco, 1948

References

Lycosidae
Araneomorphae genera
Spiders of Asia
Spiders of South America
Spiders of Africa